Ettrick is a village in Trempealeau County, Wisconsin, United States. The population was 525 at the 2020 census. The village is surrounded by the Town of Ettrick.

History
The post office was originally named Armagh when it was established in July, 1860. However, the first postmaster, John Cance, renamed it a few months later to Ettrick for Ettrick Forest, which is a hunting preserve in Scotland.

Geography
Ettrick is located at  (44.169531, -91.269032).

Demographics

2010 census
As of the census of 2010, there were 524 people, 231 households, and 145 families living in the village. The racial makeup of the village was 98.1% White, 0.2% African American, 0.2% Native American, 0.8% from other races, and 0.8% from two or more races. Hispanic or Latino of any race were 2.1% of the population.

There were 231 households, of which 33.3% had children under the age of 18 living with them, 48.1% were married couples living together, 11.7% had a female householder with no husband present, 3.0% had a male householder with no wife present, and 37.2% were non-families. 30.7% of all households were made up of individuals, and 13.9% had someone living alone who was 65 years of age or older. The average household size was 2.27 and the average family size was 2.86.

The median age in the village was 40.8 years. 24% of residents were under the age of 18; 7.3% were between the ages of 18 and 24; 24.7% were from 25 to 44; 27.6% were from 45 to 64; and 16.4% were 65 years of age or older. The gender makeup of the village was 49.4% male and 50.6% female.

2000 census

As of the census of 2000, there were 521 people, 241 households, and 129 families living in the village. The population density was 798.0 people per square mile (309.5/km2). There were 254 housing units at an average density of 389.0 per square mile (150.9/km2). The racial makeup of the village was 98.66% White, 0.19% Black or African American, 0.19% Asian, and 0.96% from two or more races. 0.00% of the population were Hispanic or Latino of any race.

There were 241 households, out of which 27.0% had children under the age of 18 living with them, 40.2% were married couples living together, 10.0% had a female householder with no husband present, and 46.1% were non-families. 39.0% of all households were made up of individuals, and 21.2% had someone living alone who was 65 years of age or older. The average household size was 2.16 and the average family size was 2.95.

In the village, the population was spread out, with 22.5% under the age of 18, 9.0% from 18 to 24, 30.1% from 25 to 44, 17.1% from 45 to 64, and 21.3% who were 65 years of age or older. The median age was 38 years. For every 100 females, there were 86.1 males. For every 100 females age 18 and over, there were 88.8 males.

The median income for a household in the village was $34,250, and the median income for a family was $45,987. Males had a median income of $29,479 versus $19,375 for females. The per capita income for the village was $16,392. About 1.4% of families and 5.2% of the population were below the poverty threshold, including 5.2% of those under age 18 and 7.5% of those age 65 or over.

Notable people
Keith C. Hardie, member of Wisconsin State Assembly

References

Further reading
 Curtiss-Wedge, Franklyn and Eben Douglas Pierce. History of Trempealeau County, Wisconsin. Chicago and Winona: H. C. Cooper, Jr., & Co., 1917.

External links
Ettrick Public Library

Villages in Trempealeau County, Wisconsin
Villages in Wisconsin